David Butts Harmony (September 2, 1832 – November 2, 1917) was a rear admiral of the United States Navy, who served during the American Civil War.

Harmony was born in Easton, Pennsylvania, and entered the navy as a midshipman on April 7, 1847, was promoted to passed midshipman on June 10, 1852, became lieutenant in 1855, and lieutenant commander in 1862.

During the Civil War he drove on the sloop-of-war  on the passage on Fort Jackson on Fort St. Philip in April 1862, and on the capture on New Orleans, and took part on engagements on the batteries on Vicksburg on Grand Gulf. He was executive officer of the ironclad monitor  in the first attack on Fort Sumter on April 7, 1863, and in the engagement with the Confederate ram  on June 17, and in the attacks on defenses at Charleston, from July 4 till September 7. He took part with the West Gulf Blockading Squadron in the actions at the Battle of Mobile Bay in August 1864 and later commanded the double-ender side-wheel gunboat  in late 1864 and into 1865.

Promoted to commander in 1866, Harmony then served at the New York Navy Yard, and then in 1867–69 commanded the Frolic in the European Squadron, one of the vessels of Admiral Farragut's squadron.

Harmony was a member of Navy Department's Examining and Retiring Boards 1883–84, was promoted to commodore in 1885, and served as Chief of the Bureau of Yards and Docks, 1885–89, and was Chairman of the Lighthouse Board, 1889–91. He retired on June 26, 1893.

Harmony died on November 2, 1917, and was buried in Section 2 of Arlington National Cemetery.

Some of his letters from the 1870s, written while on active duty, are archived at the National Archives and Records Administration in Washington, D.C.

Papers from the Mixsell-Mathews Estate
A selection of David Harmony's official papers, from the estate of Isabel Mixsell-Mathews, can be viewed here:
 David B. Harmony Papers 1847–1869
 David B. Harmony Papers 1870–1877

References

 Inventory of the Naval Records Collection of the Office of Naval Records and Library, in Record Group 45.  Appendix N.  List of Personal Letter books of U.S. Naval Officers.  June 21, 2005.  Naval Historical Center. Viewed April 8, 2006.

External links
  

1832 births
1917 deaths
United States Navy admirals
Union Navy officers
Burials at Arlington National Cemetery
People from Easton, Pennsylvania
Military personnel from Pennsylvania